Davey Blue is an album by saxophonist David "Fathead" Newman which was recorded in 2001 and released on the HighNote label early the following year.

Reception

In his review on Allmusic, Scott Yanow states: "This excellent session does a fine job of showing off David "Fathead" Newman's jazz talents. ... sounding at his prime on each of his instruments. Recommended". In JazzTimes, David Franklin noted "It’s hard to fault listeners for thinking of David “Fathead” Newman as only a great rhythm and blues tenor player, since many of his short solos on famous Ray Charles recordings have become classics in their own right. But  Newman regrets that more people don’t realize he is at heart a straightahead, mainstream player who just happened to be there in the mid-’50s when Charles needed a Texas tenor. If his own previous releases didn’t set the record straight, Davey Blue just might".

Track listing 
All compositions by David "Fathead" Newman except where noted
 "Cellar Groove" (Norris Austin) – 6:10
 "Cristo Redentor" (Duke Pearson) – 6:47
 "For Stanley" – 5:33
 "A Child Is Born" (Thad Jones) – 5:49
 "Black" (Cedar Walton) – 5:34
 "Amandla" – 4:17
 "Davey Blue" – 13:00
 "Freedom Jazz Dance" (Eddie Harris) – 6:25

Personnel 
David "Fathead" Newman – tenor saxophone, alto saxophone, flute
Cedar Walton – piano 
Bryan Carrott – vibraphone
David Williams – bass 
Kenny Washington – drums

References 

David "Fathead" Newman albums
2002 albums
HighNote Records albums